Likhtarovich is a gender-neutral Belarusian surname. Notable people with the surname include:

Dzmitry Likhtarovich (born 1978), Belarusian footballer
Tatsiana Likhtarovich (born 1988), Belarusian basketball player

Belarusian-language surnames